Darbya is a genus of sea snails, marine gastropod mollusks in the family Borsoniidae.

Species
Species within the genus Borsonia include:
 Darbya lira Bartsch, 1934

Distribution
This marine genus occurs off Puerto Rico and the US Virgin Islands.

References

 Paul Bartsch, New Mollusks of the family Turritidae; Smithsonian miscellaneous collections v. 91 (1947)

External links
  Bouchet P., Kantor Yu.I., Sysoev A. & Puillandre N. (2011) A new operational classification of the Conoidea. Journal of Molluscan Studies 77: 273-308.

 
Gastropod genera